Alligator is a town in Bolivar County, Mississippi, United States. Per the 2020 Census, the population was 116.

In 2009, Tommie "Tomaso"  Brown was elected Alligator's first black mayor. He defeated Robert Fava, the mayor since 1979.

History
The town takes its name from Alligator Lake, a lake in the town which once had a large alligator population.

Geography

Demographics

2020 census

Note: the US Census treats Hispanic/Latino as an ethnic category. This table excludes Latinos from the racial categories and assigns them to a separate category. Hispanics/Latinos can be of any race.

2000 Census
As of the census of 2000, there were 220 people, 77 households, and 58 families residing in the town. The population density was 223.7 people per square mile (86.7/km2). There were 81 housing units at an average density of 82.3 per square mile (31.9/km2). The racial makeup of the town was 20.91% White, 77.27% African American, and 1.82% from two or more races.

There were 77 households, out of which 39.0% had children under the age of 18 living with them, 35.1% were married couples living together, 35.1% had a female householder with no husband present, and 23.4% were non-families. 23.4% of all households were made up of individuals, and 10.4% had someone living alone who was 65 years of age or older. The average household size was 2.86 and the average family size was 3.27.

In the town, the population was spread out, with 39.1% under the age of 18, 4.5% from 18 to 24, 27.3% from 25 to 44, 16.8% from 45 to 64, and 12.3% who were 65 years of age or older. The median age was 29 years. For every 100 females, there were 83.3 males. For every 100 females age 18 and over, there were 74.0 males.

The median income for a household in the town was $16,667, and the median income for a family was $17,083. Males had a median income of $21,875 versus $14,063 for females. The per capita income for the town was $9,567. About 41.5% of families and 47.2% of the population were below the poverty line, including 69.3% of those under the age of eighteen and 35.3% of those sixty five or over.

Education
Duncan is served by the North Bolivar Consolidated School District, formerly known as the North Bolivar School District until it consolidated in 2014.

Students are zoned to Brooks Elementary School in Duncan, as it belonged to the pre-consolidation North Bolivar School District, and Northside High School (the only secondary school in the district) in Shelby.

Northside High opened in 2018 after Broad Street High School in Shelby consolidated into it. Shelby Middle School closed in 2018.

Notable people
 Charles Bennett, defensive end in the National Football League who played for the Miami Dolphins
 Tony Bennett, professional football player
 Jack Butler, author
 Fred Coe, television producer and director
 Johnny Drummer, Chicago blues and soul blues singer, keyboardist, drummer, harmonica player, and songwriter
 Matt Duff, former Major League Baseball pitcher

Gallery

References

Towns in Bolivar County, Mississippi
Towns in Mississippi